A nationwide consultative referendum (全國性公民投票) was held in Taiwan on 20 March 2004 to coincide with the 2004 presidential election. Voters were asked two questions regarding the relationship between Taiwan (ROC) and China (PRC), and how Taiwan should relate to China. The initiation of this referendum by President Chen Shui-bian came under intense criticism from China because it was seen as an exercise for an eventual vote on Taiwanese independence. The Pan-Blue Coalition urged a boycott, citing that the referendum was illegal and unnecessary.

Over 90% of voters approved the two questions, but the results were invalid due to insufficient voter turnout, which was below 50%.

Background
On 29 November 2003, President Chen Shui-bian announced that given that the PRC had missiles aimed at Taiwan, he had the power under the defensive referendum clause of the Referendum Act to order a referendum on sovereignty, although he did not do so under pressure by the USA. This statement was very strongly criticized both by Beijing and by the Pan-Blue Coalition. But instead, he proposed a referendum to ask the PRC to remove the hundreds of missiles it has aimed at Taiwan.

In a televised address made on 16 January 2004, President Chen reiterated his "Four Noes and One Without" pledge, justified the "peace referendum," and announced its questions.

The vetting of the referendum bill appeared to alarm Beijing which issued more sharp threats of a strong reaction if a referendum bill passed which would allow a vote on sovereignty issues such as the territory and flag of the ROC. The final bill that was passed by the Legislative Yuan on 27 November 2003 did not contain restrictions on the content of any referendums, but did include very high hurdles for referendums on constitutional issues. These hurdles were largely put in place by the Pan-Blue Coalition majority in the legislature. The bill also contained a provision for a defensive referendum to be called if the sovereignty of the ROC was under threat. In response to the referendum passage, Beijing issued vague statements of unease.

Questions

Proposal 1

Proposal 2

Campaign
A series of ten debates were held over five days (Wednesdays and Sundays) on the referendum (first pair on first question; second on second; pro-government listed before con-)
29 February – Cabinet spokesman Lin Chia-lung v. independent Legislator Kao Chin Su-mei; Kaohsiung Mayor Frank Hsieh v. Commentator Li Ao
3 March – Office of the President's Deputy Secretary-General Joseph Wu v. poet Chan Chao-li, Minister without Portfolio Yeh Jiunn-rong v. former DPP Chairman Hsu Hsin-liang
7 March – TSU Legislator Lo Chih-ming v. former Control Yuan member Yeh Yao-peng; DPP Legislator Chiu Tai-san v. sociologist Timothy Ting
10 March – DPP Legislator You Ching v. Green Party Taiwan acting convener Kao Cheng-yan; DPP Legislator Cho Jung-tai v. mainland exile Ruan Ming
14 March – DPP Legislator Julian Kuo v. anti-March 20 referendum alliance leader Jaw Shaw-kong; Mainland Affairs Council Chairwoman Tsai Ing-wen v. independent Legislator Sisy Chen

The "no" campaign was not argued by active political figures in the Pan-Blue Coalition, and the CEC at first found it difficult to find people to take the "no" position. The Pan-Blue Coalition made it clear that it was in favour of the proposals, but believed that the referendum process itself was illegal and a prelude to more controversial action. As a consequence, the Pan-Blue Coalition asked its supporters not to vote at all in the referendum, with the intention of having the number of valid votes fall below the 50% voter threshold necessary to have a valid referendum. Because of this strategy, a major controversy was the format of the referendum, specifically as to whether the referendum questions would be on the same ballots as the Presidency. After much debate, the CEC decided that there would be a U-shaped queue in which people would first cast a ballot for president and then cast a separate ballot for each of the two questions. Voters who chose not to cast a referendum ballot could exit the line at the base of the U. Near the end of the campaign, the CEC issued a number of conflicting and constantly changing directives as to what would constitute a valid ballot.

Results

References

External links
President Chen's Televised Statement of the Peace Referendum on March 20

Referendums in Taiwan
Taiwan
Referendum
Cross-Strait relations